Neocorini is an obsolete tribe of beetles in the subfamily Cerambycinae, now placed in the Callidiopini. 

It contained the following genera:
 Aleiphaquilon
 Coscinedes
 Fregolia
 Marauna
 Myrmeocorus
 Neocoridolon
 Neocorus

References

Obsolete animal taxa
 
Cerambycinae